Midnight Sun (M'Nai) is a fictional character and supervillain appearing in American comic books published by Marvel Comics.

Publication history

He first appeared in Marvel Special Edition #16 (Feb. 1974), and was created by Steve Englehart, Jim Starlin, and Al Milgrom.

Fictional character biography

Midnight
Midnight Sun began life as M'Nai, a child in a small African village which Zheng Zu was using as his headquarters. When the British Armed Forces attacked the village, M'Nai's entire family was killed and M'Nai suffered permanent facial scars. Noticing that M'Nai did not cry despite his injury, Zheng Zu decided to raise the child in China as his own, alongside his son Shang-Chi. Taking the identity of "Midnight", M'Nai wore a mask at all times to hide his facial scar. Although he and Shang-Chi sometimes came to blows, they grew up as friends, a relationship which would end when Shang-Chi rebelled against his father and left.

Midnight continued to work as Zheng Zu's agent until he was ordered to assassinate Shang-Chi. Their friendship unraveled during the mission, as Midnight mocked Shang-Chi's attempts to convince him to renounce their father's villainy. Midnight proclaimed that his heart was filled with unspeakable hatred for humanity due to the way that his family was killed and his face irreversibly disfigured and renounced his friendship with Shang-Chi. While fighting Midnight at the top of a winch, Shang-Chi dodged a powerful kick. The kick was so forceful that Midnight lost his balance and fell to his apparent death.

Secretly, Midnight was plucked from the time-stream by Kang the Conqueror moments before his death. Kang used Midnight as a soldier in his Legion of the Unliving, sending him to fight the Avengers. He was knocked unconscious by Mantis. After the end of the battle, Immortus returned him to his own time, where his death was allowed to take its course. Midnight's cape caught on the winch as he fell, breaking his neck. As his body hung from the winch, Shang-Chi contemplated climbing up to retrieve the body and look upon his brother's scarred face (which he never saw when he was alive) but opted not to out of respect for Midnight.

Midnight's body was obtained by the Kree and kept in cold storage for years. When the Kree realized that they needed an agent who could defeat the Silver Surfer in combat, a Kree scientist named Kar-Sagg reanimated Midnight's brain and placed it in a cloned body which had been enhanced with superhuman powers to make him a match for the Silver Surfer. It is at this point that he was renamed "Midnight Sun".

Midnight Sun
Midnight Sun fought the Silver Surfer alongside the Kree. With the help of a light-deadening dust, he used his talent for stealth to hit the Surfer with several sneak attacks. However, the Surfer eventually detected him and used his board to trap Midnight Sun, until an assault from a Kree vessel forced him to flee. The two fought one-on-one when the Kree sent Midnight Sun to protect Hala from the Surfer, but the Surfer defeated him again. Because the Kree's alterations had left him unable to speak or use his fingers, Silver Surfer was never aware of Midnight Sun's name or background, and could not communicate with him. Although his powers far exceeded Midnight Sun's, the Surfer considered him a very frustrating opponent due to his stony silence and often uncertain motivations, as well as his ability to catch the Surfer off-guard with surprise attacks and skillful strikes and dodges.

In one of Midnight Sun's multiple battles with the Surfer, he interrupts a conflict between the Kree and the Skrull.

After the fight, Midnight Sun was taken to a Kree laboratory where he was placed in the care of Kar-Sagg. It was revealed that Midnight Sun had been resurrected without his memories of who or what he was, but that they still existed in his subconscious mind due to the Kree scientists not wanting to risk losing his martial arts skills. It was ultimately decided that the removal of all non-combat skill related subconscious memory might make him a more effective fighter, but during the procedure Midnight Sun was made to confront elements of his past as the machine sifted through his mind. This caused him to resist and rebel against Kar-Sagg and ultimately defeat an entire squad of Kree soldiers sent to subdue him. Impressed that Midnight Sun managed to rebel against him, Kar-Sagg took pity on him as he allowed him to leave unharmed. As he left, the memories of his past he had relived were ultimately gone from his mind, leaving him to ponder the question of who he was.

Requiring no sustenance, Midnight Sun meditated on the moon, trying to remember his past. When he detected the Silver Surfer passing by, he confronted him, holding a vague memory that the Silver Surfer was someone from his past who might provide him with clues. Mute, and unable to communicate with the Surfer, Midnight Sun attacked the Surfer in order to force him to stay, and the Surfer defeated him again. When the Surfer removed Midnight Sun's mask in order to treat his injuries, he was surprised to discover a horribly mangled face. Enraged, Midnight Sun renewed their fight until the Inhumans intervened, offering to take him back to Atillan, their city on the moon, in order to treat his wounds and find some means to communicate with him. Midnight Sun and the Silver Surfer parted as friends.

A mute Midnight Sun later returned to fight Shang-Chi once more, as residual memories made him recognize Shang-Chi. Unable to speak, Midnight Sun once again sought to have his opponent reveal his identity to him but this time, used his circular discs bonded to his hands to carve into a wall a request for Shang-Chi to tell him who he was. Recognizing his adopted brother's fighting style and Midnight Sun's similar garb to Midnight, Shang-Shi revealed to Midnight Sun his name and identity. Satisfied, Midnight Sun and Shang-Chi left as friends.

Ultimately, at some point, Midnight Sun regained his ability to speak and full memories through unrevealed means. He also shed his metallic zentai body encasement suit and discs that were bonded to his hands and feet and began wearing a modified version of his old full body spandex costume minus the fedora he once wore. By this point, he had learned of his adopted father's death and began a plot to murder the heads of the triads and by powerful black magic, the Mao Shan Pai, gain power and influence over the triads, finally fulfilling Zheng Zu's dream of world conquest. As the plot resulted in the death of Leiko Wu, her former lover Shang-Chi came to London to investigate with MI:6, the Daughters of the Dragon, and the Sons of the Tiger. Midnight Sun's plan is ultimately foiled when the ritual resurrects Leiko instead of granting him power he desired. While he is pulled into a dimensional portal by the enraged spirits of the triad leaders he had killed, Midnight Sun begs his brother to help him, as all he wanted to do was to honor their father.

Midnight Sun is eventually able to escape his imprisonment by unknown means. He leads a group of Shang-Chi's enemies including Razor Fist, Shen Kuei, Death-Hand, Shadow Stalker, Tiger-Claw and Shockwave to ambush Shang-Chi and Domino while the two are on a date in Hong Kong. Shang-Chi defeats his former brother with a single kick during the fight. M'Nai is further injured when Domino "accidentally" stabs him in the hand while fixing a drink for Shang-Chi. After the fight, Shang-Chi warns Midnight Sun and the others to retreat and forget the ambush ever took place or to face further attacks from Domino.

Powers and abilities
As an agent of Zheng Zu, Midnight was a highly trained martial artist and espionage agent. He was a master of unarmed combat and many martial arts weapons, particularly daggers, nunchaku, and shuriken. His specialty was vanishing into shadows and ambushing his opponents. He has had years of experienced in the disciplines of Kung Fu, and is an accomplished Kung Fu practitioner.

When Kar-Sagg transformed him into a Kree agent, he transferred Midnight's brain into a powerful cloned body. His new body has superhuman strength, stamina, durability, agility, and reflexes. Most notably, silver discs were grafted to the palms of his hands and the soles of his feet, which provide propellant force that allows him to travel through space. He often used these discs to bash his enemies using his martial arts skills. His body was also modified to allow him to survive outer-space conditions, and he appears to have no need for food or rest. He is also mute. Although the exact extent of his superhuman strength, speed, and toughness are unknown, he was capable of causing pain to the Silver Surfer, and surviving the Surfer's repeated attacks without serious injury. His superhuman attributes were made more formidable by the fact that he retains all of his martial arts skills and affinity for darkness, even after suffering amnesia.

References

External links

 http://www.marvel.com/universe/Midnight_Sun

Characters created by Al Milgrom
Characters created by Jim Starlin
Characters created by Steve Englehart
Comics characters introduced in 1974
Fictional African people
Fictional assassins in comics
Marvel Comics characters with superhuman strength
Marvel Comics martial artists
Marvel Comics supervillains
Science fiction comics characters
Science fiction comics
Shang-Chi characters